The Government Office is a ministry-level agency in Vietnam that assists the Government and the Prime Minister. The Government Office is headed by a Chief. The current Chief of the Government Office of Vietnam is Trần Văn Sơn.

Roles and functions
The Government Office has several roles and functions, notably:
To assist the Government in organizing joint activities of the Government
To assist the Prime Minister in leading, directing and operating activities of the Government and state administrative system from central to local levels
To provide services for the direction and administration of the Government, the Prime Minister and to provide information to the public under the provisions of law
To ensure the physical conditions and technical requirements for the activities of the Government and the Prime Minister.

Departments
Department of Complaint, Denunciation and Anti-corruption Monitoring (Department I)
Department of Internal Affairs (Department II)
Department of Central and Local Agencies Coordination Monitoring (Department III)
Department of General Affairs
Department of State Administrative Organization and Public Affairs
Department of Legal Affairs
Department of International Relations
Department of Economic Sectors
Department of General Economics 
Department of Science, Education, Culture and Social Affairs
Department of Enterprise Innovation
Department of Secretarial and Editorial Affairs
Department of Administrative Archives
Department of Organization and Personnel
Department of Finance and Planning
Bureau of Management
Bureau of Administration and Management II
Informatics Center
Vietnam Government Portal (VGP)

External links
Official site

Government ministries of Vietnam
Government of Vietnam
Governmental office in Hanoi